Simon Robert Maurice Baynes (born 21 April 1960) is a British Conservative politician who served as Parliamentary Under-Secretary of State for Justice and Tackling Illegal Migration from July to September 2022. He was elected as the Member of Parliament (MP) for Clwyd South at the 2019 general election. Baynes worked in finance for J.P. Morgan Cazenove from 1982 to 2006, before running a small bookshop.

Early life and education
Baynes was born in Lesbury, Northumberland, the son of Sir John Christopher Malcolm Baynes, 7th Baronet and Shirley Maxwell Baynes (née Dodds). He grew up in Montgomeryshire, where his father ran the Lake Vyrnwy Hotel. He and his father have since co-authored a book on the hotel.

He was educated at Belhaven Hill Preparatory School and Shrewsbury School before going up to Magdalene College, Cambridge, where he completed a BA in History. Whilst at the university, he was a choral exhibitioner and won the Dunster History Essay Prize. He was also President of the Cambridge Union. In 1982, he was Chairman of the Cambridge University Conservative Association.

Early career 
Baynes was a partner at Cazenove & Co., and latterly a managing director of JPMorgan Cazenove, from 1982 to 2006. From 2007 to 2011, he was the owner and bookseller of Simon Baynes - Books and Music in Shrewsbury.

He has been a trustee (and was the founder) of Concertina - Music for the Elderly, which he formed in 1998 with his wife. It provides live music in care homes for the elderly. His mother-in-law suffered from dementia.  He founded the Bodfach Charitable Trust in 2006, which he is also a trustee of. In addition, he has been a trustee of the Y Dolydd Llanfyllin Workhouse (2005–12), Mid-Wales Opera (2012–19), Llangollen International Musical Eisteddfod (2017–19) and Friends of St Myllin's Church (2018–19), the latter of which he is a patron of.

From 2005 to 2012, Baynes was Chairman of North Powys Youth Music. He has also been Chairman of the Welsh Historic Gardens Trust (2016–19) and the Holroyd Community Theatre (2018–19). He was the founder and Chairman of the Montgomeryshire Literary Festival (2018–19). From 2017 to 2019, he was a governor at Llanfyllin High School.

Political career 
He stood as the Welsh Conservative candidate in Montgomeryshire in 2005, finishing second behind incumbent Liberal Democrat MP Lembit Öpik. He unsuccessfully sought the Conservative nomination for the seat of South Staffordshire in 2010, losing out to future cabinet minister Gavin Williamson. He then contested Dwyfor Meirionnydd at the 2010 general election, and the same seat in the 2011 National Assembly for Wales Election, both times without success.

Baynes was a Conservative member of Powys County Council from 2008 to 2012, and joint leader of the Conservative group. The following year, he joined Llanfyllin Town Council, where he remained a member until 2019. He served as the mayor of the eponymous Montgomeryshire town of Llanfyllin from 2018 to 2020.

He has contested elections in Clwyd South on three occasions. He first contested Clwyd South in the 2016 Welsh Assembly election. In 2017 he contested the marginal Westminster seat. On all three occasions he finished second. He was elected to Parliament for Clwyd South at the 2019 general election, to serve in the 58th Parliament. He defeated the incumbent Labour MP Susan Elan Jones.

On 2 March 2020, Baynes became a member of the Welsh Affairs Select Committee.

He endorsed Priti Patel in the July 2022 Conservative Party leadership election, but she did not end up standing. He then supported Rishi Sunak.

Personal life
Baynes married his wife Margaret (known as Maggie), an architect, in 1992. They have two daughters.

He lists his recreations as "music (including playing the organ for church services), theatre, concerts, gardening, heritage".

Publications 

 (with Sir John Baynes, G. V. Westropp) Lake Vyrnwy: The Story of a Sporting Hotel. United Kingdom, Quiller Publishing, Limited, 2019. .
 The Forgotten Country House: The Rise and Fall of Roundway Park. United Kingdom, Quiller Press, Limited, 2019. .

Electoral history

2019 UK general election

2017 UK general election

2016 Welsh Assembly election

2011 Welsh Assembly election

2010 UK general election

2005 UK general election

References

External links

1960 births
Living people
People educated at Belhaven Hill School
People educated at Shrewsbury School
Alumni of Magdalene College, Cambridge
UK MPs 2019–present
Welsh Conservative Party politicians
People from Clwyd
Conservative Party (UK) MPs for Welsh constituencies